Christian Bautista has released a total of eight studio albums, one live album, two compilation albums and twenty-two solo singles in his entire career. Bautista is the first artist of the 2000s, to have his debut album certified multi-platinum in several South-East Asian countries like the Philippines, Indonesia and Thailand. Furthermore, his second album Completely was certified Platinum in other Asian countries. Aside from Nina, he was considered to be the biggest-selling artist of Warner Music Philippines. However, he transferred to Universal Records in 2009, making a cover album composed of songs originally released by OPM legend Jose Mari Chan. To date, Bautista has sold more than 700,000 albums in Asia.

Albums

Studio albums

Live albums

International albums

Compilations

Re-issues / Re-releases
 2005: Christian Bautista (Limited Edition)
 2007: Christian Bautista Live! (Special Christmas Edition)
 2010: Romance Revisited: The Love Songs of Jose Mari Chan (Platinum Edition)

Singles

Soundtracks

Other appearances

Music videos

Notes

References

Discographies of Filipino artists
Pop music discographies